The Udaipur City–Haridwar Express is an Express train belonging to North Western Railway zone that runs between  and  in India. It is currently being operated with 19609/19610 train numbers on a tri-weekly basis.

Service

The 19609/Udaipur City–Haridwar Express has an average speed of 46 km/hr and covers 975 km in 21h 10m. The 19610/Haridwar–Udaipur City Express has an average speed of 47 km/hr and covers 975 km in 20h 55m.

Route and halts 

The important halts of the train are:

 
 
 
 
 
 
 
 
 
 
 
 Old

Coach composition

The train has standard LHB rakes with a max speed of 110 kmph. The train consists of 18 coaches:

 1 AC II Tier
 2 AC III Tier
 9 Sleeper coaches
 4 General Unreserved
 2 Seating cum Luggage Rake

Traction

Both trains are hauled by an Abu Road Loco Shed-based WDM-3A diesel locomotive.

Direction reversal

The train reverses its direction 1 times:

See also 

 Udaipur City railway station
 Haridwar railway station

Notes

References

External links 

 19609/Udaipur - Haridwar Express India Rail Info
 19610/Haridwar - Udaipur Express India Rail Info

Transport in Udaipur
Trains from Haridwar
Express trains in India
Rail transport in Delhi
Rail transport in Haryana
Rail transport in Rajasthan
Railway services introduced in 2017